Cheilodipterus is a genus of fishes in the family Apogonidae, the cardinalfishes. They are native to the Indian Ocean and the western Pacific Ocean.

Species
The 17 recognized species in this genus are:
 Cheilodipterus alleni Gon, 1993 (Allen's cardinalfish)
 Cheilodipterus arabicus (Gmelin, 1789) (tiger cardinalfish)
 Cheilodipterus artus J. L. B. Smith, 1961 (wolf cardinalfish)
 Cheilodipterus intermedius Gon, 1993 (intermediate cardinalfish)
 Cheilodipterus isostigmus (L. P. Schultz, 1940) (dog-toothed cardinalfish)
 Cheilodipterus lachneri Klausewitz, 1959 (Aqaba cardinalfish)
 Cheilodipterus macrodon (Lacépède, 1802) (large-toothed cardinalfish)
 Cheilodipterus nigrotaeniatus H. M. Smith & Radcliffe, 1912
 Cheilodipterus novemstriatus (Rüppell, 1838) (Indian Ocean two-spot cardinalfish)
 Cheilodipterus octovittatus G. Cuvier, 1828
 Cheilodipterus parazonatus Gon, 1993 (mimic cardinalfish)
 Cheilodipterus persicus Gon, 1993 (Persian cardinalfish)
 Cheilodipterus pygmaios Gon, 1993
 Cheilodipterus quinquelineatus G. Cuvier, 1828 (five-lined cardinalfish)
 Cheilodipterus singapurensis Bleeker, 1860 (truncated cardinalfish)
 Cheilodipterus subulatus M. C. W. Weber, 1909
 Cheilodipterus zonatus H. M. Smith & Radcliffe, 1912 (yellowbelly cardinalfish)

References

 
Apogoninae
Marine fish genera
Taxa named by Bernard Germain de Lacépède